"Beer Man" is the debut song co-written and recorded by American country music artist Trent Willmon.  It was released in April 2004 as the first single from the album Trent Willmon.  The song reached #30 on the Billboard Hot Country Singles & Tracks chart.  The song was written by Willmon and Casey Beathard.

Chart performance

References

2004 debut singles
2004 songs
Trent Willmon songs
Songs written by Casey Beathard
Songs written by Trent Willmon
Song recordings produced by Frank Rogers (record producer)
Columbia Records singles